Joy Fahrenkrog (born November 6, 1979) is best known for her archery. She was born in Castle Rock, Colorado and currently resides in Lucerne, Switzerland.

Archery background
Fahrenkrog is a four-time member of the United States Archery Team (2004–2008) and former Chula Vista Olympic Training Center Resident Athlete (2006–2007). She began archery in the winter of 2002 after graduating from Skidmore College in Saratoga Springs, New York, where she majored in Economics. In 2004, she tried out for her first Olympic team but just missed it, finishing 6th at the trials. In 2008, she tried for a second time and placed 7th in the first round of trials. After taking three months off due to a tear in her teres minor, she failed to advance to the third round of trials for the Beijing team, finishing 15th.

Despite not making either Olympic team, Joy did attend both the Athens and the Beijing games. In 2004, she went as a spectator and in 2008, she had a job as a journalist working for the Olympic News Service. In 2008, she was also part of two ad campaigns, one for Budweiser and one for Polo Ralph Lauren. Videos of each can be found on her website.

Fahrenkrog has been a consistent top 8 finisher in national-level events and has competed internationally in Bulgaria, Mexico, the Netherlands, China and Korea. Highlights of her career include 2nd and 3rd-place finishes at the US Indoor Nationals in 2006 and 2007 as well as a 1st-place finish at the World Ranking Event in Puerto Rico in 2007.

Personal information
Fahrenkrog was born in Colorado in 1979. When she was 15, she was an exchange student to France with Rotary International. She completed high school at Phillips Exeter Academy in Exeter, New Hampshire. Upon graduating, she attended Skidmore College in Saratoga Springs, New York, spending one year at the London School of Economics in England. After graduating from college, Fahrenkrog took a job with Schwab Capital Markets and worked there until 2004 when she left to train full-time for the Olympics. Throughout the five years that she was training, she held a marketing job at Northwestern Mutual.

Before picking up a bow, Fahrenkrog was a rower. She competed at Exeter, in college and after college for a total of 7 years. Her most notable accomplishment was a gold medal finish at the Henley Women's Regatta in England in 2001. She has also run two marathons for charity, the Boston Marathon in 2002 for cancer research and the Rock 'n' Roll San Diego Marathon in 2008 for Team Darfur.

When she is not working or training, Fahrenkrog spends time with her friends and family and volunteers for the local community. While in California, she volunteered at San Diego 211, Endow Chula Vista, Eastlake Church and the Purple Palace. Throughout her archery career, she has been actively involved with Junior Olympic Archery Development (JOAD) and has spent time working with kids with the North Dakota Shooting Sports Program and local clubs in Massachusetts and California.

Fahrenkrog now lives in Luzern, Switzerland, where she was married June 5, 2009 to Tim Foster. The pair were engaged at the 2008 Olympic Games in Beijing on August 18, 2008.

National and international tournaments
World Ranking Event, Puerto Rico 2007 - 1st
US Indoor Nationals 2006 - 2nd
World Archery Festival 2004 - 3rd
Texas Shootout 2005 - 3rd
US Indoor Nationals 2007 - 3rd
Texas Shootout 2007 - 3rd
US Indoor Nationals 2004 - 5th
Gold Cup 2004 - 5th
Face 2 Face, Amsterdam 2004 - 5th
US World Indoor Trials 2005 - 5th
US Outdoor Nationals 2007 - 5th
US Open 2007 - 5th
US Olympic Trials 2004 - 6th
US Open 2005 - 6th
Texas Shootout 2006 - 6th
US Outdoor Nationals 2006 - 6th
US Outdoor Nationals 2004 - 7th
1st Leg of Olympic Trials 2008 - 7th
Arizona Cup 2004 - 8th
US Outdoor Nationals 2005 - 8th
Gold Cup 2006 - 8th
Arizona Cup 2005 - 9th
US World Outdoor Trials 2007 - 9th
US World Outdoor Trials 2005 - 10th

References

External links
https://web.archive.org/web/20090206201256/http://joyfahrenkrog.com/
http://www.nytimes.com/2009/06/07/fashion/weddings/07fahrenkrog.html
https://web.archive.org/web/20110728082840/http://teamdarfur.org/node/336
https://teamdarfur.ngphost.com/node/691

1979 births
American female archers
Living people
21st-century American women